2009 United Nations Climate Change Conference
2021/2022 Convention on Biological Diversity Conference
2022 United Nations Biodiversity Conference